The 1949 Colorado A&M Aggies football team represented Colorado State College of Agriculture and Mechanic Arts in the Skyline Six Conference during the 1949 college football season.  In their third season under head coach Bob Davis, the Aggies compiled a 9–1 record (4–1 against Skyline opponents), finished second in the Skyline Conference, and outscored all opponents by a total of 206 to 86.

Halfback Eddie Hanna died from suspected cardiac arrest following the Aggies' opening game against Colorado College. His jersey number (No. 21) was immediately retired following his death, and no player has worn it since.

Thurman "Fum" McGraw received first-team honors from the International News Service as an offensive tackle on the 1949 College Football All-America Team. He was the first Colorado A&M player to receive first-team All-America honors. McGraw went on to play five seasons in the National Football League as a defensive tackle for the Detroit Lions.

Three Colorado Agricultural players received all-conference honors in 1949: McGraw, guard Dale Dodrill, and end George Jones.

Schedule

References

Colorado AandM
Colorado State Rams football seasons
Colorado AandM Aggies football